The fourth season of One Tree Hill began airing on September 27, 2006. The season concluded on June 13, 2007, after 21 episodes. This is the first season to air on the newly formed The CW television network. The season had a brief hiatus for three months from February 2007 to May 2007, to make their timeslot available for the short-lived series Pussycat Dolls Present: The Search for the Next Doll. The show returned May 2nd, 2007 to air the last 6 episodes of the season. This marked the first and last season of the show to air into June. 

In this season, most episodes were named after rock albums rather than after songs. Season four rose in ratings, averaging 3.9 million viewers weekly, becoming #136 in the Nielsen ratings system. Episode #10 "Songs To Love and Die By" was the highest rated episode of the season by having 4.24 Million viewers tuning in.

Overview
With only 4 months of high school left, the realization that, for students and parents alike, life is changing forever. There are new loves to nurture and old scores to settle. Lucas, Peyton, and Brooke's long-running love triangle has finally reaches a conclusion. Keith's memory - or is it his spirit? - motivates Lucas and Nathan, but haunts Dan. Haley receives some news that will forever impact Nathan and her life. Peyton is being stalked by a guy who claims to be a long-lost family member who's related to Ellie. Brooke begins an unlikely friendship with Rachel after moving in with her. Lucas begins to question what truly happened on that horrible day Keith died. And the Ravens, coached by Coach Whitey Durham, have one more shot at basketball glory and the state title.

Cast and characters

Regular
 Chad Michael Murray as Lucas Scott (21 episodes)
 James Lafferty as Nathan Scott (21 episodes)
 Hilarie Burton as Peyton Sawyer (21 episodes)
 Bethany Joy Galeotti as Haley James Scott (21 episodes)
 Paul Johansson as Dan Scott (20 episodes)
 Sophia Bush as Brooke Davis (21 episodes)
 Barbara Alyn Woods as Deb Scott (14 episodes)
 Lee Norris as Mouth McFadden (17 episodes)
 Antwon Tanner as Skills Taylor (13 episodes)
 Danneel Harris as Rachel Gatina (16 episodes)
 Barry Corbin as Whitey Durham (12 episodes)
 Moira Kelly as Karen Roe (20 episodes)

Recurring
 Bevin Prince as Bevin Mirskey (9 episodes)
Shawn Shepard as Principal Turner (9 episodes)
 Stephen Colletti as Chase Adams (9 episodes)
 Kelsey Chow as Gigi Silveri (7 episodes)
 Matt Barr as Ian Banks (8 episodes)
 Vaughn Wilson as Fergie Thompson (7 episodes) 
 Cullen Moss as Junk Moretti (6 episodes)
 Elisabeth Harnois as Shelley Simon (6 episodes)
 Ernest Waddell as Derek Sommers (4 episodes)
 Rick Fox as Daunte Jones (4 episodes)
Amber Wallace as Glenda Farrell (4 episodes)
 Allison Scagliotti as Abigail "Abby" Brown (3 episodes)
 Michael Trucco as Cooper Lee (2 episodes)
 Tyler Hilton as Chris Keller (1 episode)
Mary Kate Englehardt as Lily Roe Scott (1 episode)

Special Guest Star
 Craig Sheffer as Keith Scott (2 episodes)

Episodes

Reception
The season premiere was seen by 3.64 million U.S. viewers and achieved a 1.7 Adults 18-49 rating, up 19% in viewers and 55% in demo from the season 3 finale. Episode 2 hit a season high in the Adults 18-49 demo with a 2.0 rating, while episode 10 hit season highs in viewers with 4.24 million. The season finale was seen by 4.5 million viewers.

DVD release
The DVD release of season four was released after the season has completed broadcast on television. It has been released in Region 1. As well as every episode from the season, the DVD release features bonus material such as, audio commentaries on some episodes from the creator and cast, deleted scenes, gag reels and behind-the-scenes featurettes.

References

One Tree Hill (TV series) seasons
2006 American television seasons
2007 American television seasons